Pierre Lestringuez (October 17, 1889 – October 18, 1950) was a French screenwriter and film actor. He wrote the screenplays for several Jean Renoir silent films during the 1920s.

Selected filmography

Actor
 The Whirlpool of Fate (1925)
 Nana (1926)
 Marquitta (1927)

Screenwriter
 The Whirlpool of Fate (1925)
 Marquitta (1927)
 Latin Quarter (1939)
 Madame Sans-Gêne (1941)
 Pamela (1945)
 Son of France (1946)
 Clandestine (1946)
 The Murdered Model (1948)
 Women and Brigands (1950)

References

Bibliography
 O'Shaughnessy, Martin. Jean Renoir. Manchester University Press, 2000.

External links

1889 births
1950 deaths
French male film actors
French male screenwriters
20th-century French screenwriters
20th-century French male writers